The 1948 Chinese presidential election was held on April 20, 1948 at the National Assembly House in Nanking. The election was conducted by the National Assembly to elect the President and Vice President of China. This is the first election under the newly adopted 1947 Constitution of the Republic of China.

This indirect elections were held during the Chinese Civil War. Chiang Kai-shek, the incumbent leader of the Nationalist government, won a landslide victory against the same party candidate Ju Zheng in the presidential election. However, Sun Fo, Chiang's preferred Vice-Presidential candidate, was defeated by General Li Zongren in the vice-presidential elections.

Chiang and Li inaugurated at the Presidential Palace in Nanking on May 20, 1948. This also marked the transition of Nationalist government to the constitutional government.

Overview

After the Northern Expedition, the Kuomintang-led Nationalist government acquired control of a unified China nominally. The party began to draft a constitution to transit the government from tutelage period to constitutional period, according to the political philosophy of Sun Yat-sen.

During the Second Sino-Japanese War, China established a close partnership with the United States and was given military and financial supports. George Marshall was appointed ambassador to Chongqing, the wartime capital, as to broker a negotiation between the Kuomintang (Nationalist Party) and Communist Party after the war. Two parties agreed to rebuild the country with democratization and military nationalization.

Simultaneously, the Nationalist government continued to draft the Constitution of the Republic of China, however it was boycotted by the Communists and the full-scale Chinese Civil War was resumed.

Electors

The election was conducted by the National Assembly in its meeting place National Assembly House in Nanking. There were 2,961 delegates elected during the 1947 Chinese National Assembly election for the 3,045 seats. In total, there were 2,859 delegates reported to the secretariat to attend this first session of the first National Assembly.

The election regulations had a 50% requirement for the President and Vice President to be elected. Since there were 3,045 seats in the National Assembly, the candidates needed to obtain 1,523 votes to be elected. This requirement could be relieved if no candidate passed this threshold in the first three rounds of voting.

Results

President

Vice-President

Vice President Candidates

Previous and next elections
There were some regime changes in China during the first half of the 20th century. Depending on the definition, possible previous and next elections for the leader of China are listed below.

See also
History of Republic of China
Nationalist government
President of the Republic of China
Vice President of the Republic of China

References

Presidential elections in the Republic of China (1912–1949)
1948 in China
1948 elections in Asia